Adam Opalski (26 November 1897 – 3 November 1963) was a Polish neurologist and neuropathologist .

He was born in Olkusz and described a specific type of characteristically altered glial cells (currently referred to as Opalski cells), developing in the brain in Wilson’s disease. He died in Warsaw.

References

1897 births
1963 deaths
Polish neurologists